"Oh Yoko!" is a 1971 song written and performed by John Lennon. It was first released on his album Imagine, and was later included in the greatest hits compilation Working Class Hero: The Definitive Lennon.

The song was written about his wife Yoko Ono, and features Nicky Hopkins on piano and co-producer Phil Spector on harmony vocal. Lennon plays harmonica for the first time on a solo recording (since the Beatles' "Rocky Raccoon"), and it would also be the last time he used the instrument in a released recording.

Background 
Lennon began writing the song in 1968 during the Beatles' visit to India, but was not fully completed until the sessions for Imagine three years later. The melody was inspired by Lonnie Donegan's "Lost John", a song Lennon enjoyed and played often. The song was recorded on 25 May 1971 at Ascot Sound Studios. Robert Christgau called it "an instant folk song worthy of Rosie & the Originals".

An uncompleted version of the song can be heard and was recorded on tape at the Sheraton Oceanus Hotel in Freeport, Bahamas, on 25 May 1969.

EMI wanted to release the song as a single but Lennon refused. The only single issued from Imagine was the title track in the United States; none was issued in the United Kingdom.

Ultimate Classic Rock critic Stephen Lewis rated it as Lennon's 10th greatest solo love song, saying that "A jaunty and swinging tune, with a breathless Nicky Hopkins piano line, the tune beats with a warm, positive optimism."

In popular culture
The song was featured in the 1998 film Rushmore, starring Bill Murray and Jason Schwartzman.
In 1973, Japanese artist Keiichi Tanaami made an animated short based on the song.

Personnel
John Lennon – vocals, electric guitar, harmonica
Nicky Hopkins – piano
Klaus Voormann – bass
Alan White – drums
Phil Spector – harmony vocal
Rod Linton – acoustic guitar
Andy Davis – acoustic guitar

References

John Lennon songs
1971 songs
Songs written by John Lennon
Song recordings produced by John Lennon
Song recordings produced by Phil Spector
Song recordings produced by Yoko Ono
Songs about Yoko Ono